Thomas Goldsborough may refer to:

 Thomas Alan Goldsborough, US judge
Thomas Goldsborough (politician) for Cambridge (UK Parliament constituency)